is a Japanese football player. He plays for Kamatamare Sanuki.

Club statistics
Updated to 23 February 2017.

References

External links

Profile at Kamatamare Sanuki

1993 births
Living people
Kansai University of International Studies alumni
Association football people from Saitama Prefecture
Japanese footballers
J2 League players
Kamatamare Sanuki players
Association football midfielders